A total of 379 species of mammals have been recorded in Australia and surrounding continental waters: 357 indigenous and 22 introduced.  The list includes 2 monotremes, 154 marsupials, 76 bats, 69 rodents (5 introduced), 10 pinnipeds, 2 terrestrial carnivorans (1 recent introduction, and 1 prehistoric introduction), 13 introduced ungulates, 2 introduced lagomorphs, 44 cetaceans and 1 sirenian.  The taxonomy and nomenclature used here generally follows Van Dyck and Strahan.

Lists of mammals of Australia
 List of bats of Australia
 List of marine mammals of Australia
 List of monotremes and marsupials of Australia
 List of placental mammals introduced to Australia
 List of rodents of Australia

Lists of mammals by Australian state or territory
 List of mammals of New South Wales
 List of mammals of South Australia
 List of mammals of the Northern Territory
 List of mammals of Victoria
 List of mammals of Western Australia
 List of mammals of Tasmania
 List of mammals of Queensland
 List of mammals of the Australian Capital Territory

Lists of mammals by Australian external territory
 List of mammals of Christmas Island
 List of mammals of the Cocos (Keeling) Islands
 List of mammals of Heard Island and McDonald Islands
 List of mammals of the Coral Sea Islands
 List of mammals of Ashmore Reef
 List of mammals of Norfolk Island
 List of mammals of Boigu, Saibai and Dauan Islands (Torres Strait)
 List of mammals of Macquarie Island

See also
 Fauna of Australia
 List of Nature Conservation Act endangered fauna of Queensland

References

 
Australia